Mark Boulle (born 21 April 1979) is an independent musician and recording artist from the Gold Coast, Australia.  As of January 2016 he has released eight albums (one of which has since been withdrawn), six of them with his band, the Haba Dudes.  He describes his music as "indie folk".

History 

Boulle was born in South Africa during the apartheid era and emigrated to Australia with his parents in 1988 at the age of eight.  In 2001 he travelled to Japan to work as an English language teacher, and there he began to play the guitar, sing and write music.  His first few gigs with his band, the Haba Dudes, were at Zullas Restaurant in Burleigh Heads on the Gold Coast, Australia, around Christmas 2005.  Since then, the line up of the band has completely changed aside from Boulle.  Mark Boulle and the Haba Dudes were finalists in the 2010 Musicoz awards.

Discography 

Aside from demos, Boulle has released the following seven albums:
 (2007) All The Leaves Are Falling Down (under his own name)
 (2007) Shoot To Kill (with the Haba Dudes)
 (2008) Music Will Make You Go Insane (with the Haba Dudes)
 (2010) Take From The Rich (with the Haba Dudes)
 (2011) So She Says (under his own name)
 (2012) Gofer Land (with the Haba Dudes)
 (2015) Humbadum (with the Haba Dudes) [withdrawn]
 (2017) Dizzy Street (with the Haba Dudes)

Recording and production 

Aside from some of the instruments on some of the songs on Shoot To Kill, all of Boulle's albums have been recorded, mixed and self-produced at his home on the Gold Coast.

Notes 

Category:Musicians from Gold Coast, Queensland

Australian musicians
1979 births
Living people